Sainte-Pétronille is a village municipality in the L'Île-d'Orléans Regional County Municipality in the Capitale-Nationale region of Quebec, Canada. It is situated on the south-western tip of Orléans Island, facing Quebec City.

Former notable residents include the Boswell family, who owned the Boswell Brewery in Quebec City from 1843 to 1952, and painter Horatio Walker, whose workshop remains.

History

In 1651, Jesuit missionaries came to the island and established a mission for Huron Indians who were displaced by attacking Iroquois. In 1759, General James Wolfe installed his headquarters there to monitor Quebec City and the two river channels of the Saint Lawrence River. After his victory at the Battle of the Plains of Abraham, the area became inhabited by well-to-do English colonists who were attracted by its romantic landscapes and its renowned microclimate. Consequently the cottage-style houses and garden landscaping gave the place a decidedly English character.

Since the topography was not well-suited for agriculture, the place became a fashionable summer resort by the mid 19th century. Hundreds of daytrippers would travel to Sainte-Pétronille by ferry for a Sunday stroll. In 1868, it became home to North America's first golf course, a three-hole course.

The religious parish of Sainte-Pétronille de Beaulieu was formed in 1870, named after Saint Petronilla (a Roman martyr of the first century), and honouring Jacques Gourdeau, sieur de Beaulieu et de la Grossardière, feudal lord of the area in the mid-17th century. The post office opened a year later under the name Beaulieu. In 1874, the Village Municipality of Beaulieu was established by separating from Saint-Pierre, becoming the youngest of the 6 municipalities on Orleans Island.

Since the village itself was almost exclusively called Sainte-Pétronille in common use, the municipality was renamed to its current name in 1980. The post office followed suit in 1991.

Demographics 

Local government
List of former mayors:

 Jacques Grisé (2001–2009)
 Harold Noël (2009–present)

See also
 Chenal de l'Île d'Orléans
 Île d'Orléans
 List of village municipalities in Quebec

References

External links

 Île d'Orléans - Sainte-Pétronille portrait

Incorporated places in Capitale-Nationale
Villages in Quebec
L'Île-d'Orléans Regional County Municipality